The 2010 Rakuten Japan Open Tennis Championships was a men's tennis tournament played on outdoor hard courts. It was the 37th edition of the event known that year as the Rakuten Japan Open Tennis Championships, and was part of the 500 Series of the 2010 ATP World Tour. It was held at the Ariake Coliseum in Tokyo, Japan, from October 4 through October 11, 2010. Rafael Nadal won the singles title.

ATP entrants

Seeds

 Rankings are based on the rankings of September 27, 2010.

Other entrants
The following players received wildcards into the singles main draw:
  Tatsuma Ito
  Kei Nishikori
  Go Soeda

The following players received entry from the qualifying draw:
  Ivan Dodig
  Rajeev Ram
  Milos Raonic
  Édouard Roger-Vasselin

Finals

Singles

 Rafael Nadal defeated  Gaël Monfils, 6–1, 7–5
It was Nadal's 7th title of the year and 43rd of his career.

Doubles

 Eric Butorac /  Jean-Julien Rojer defeated  Andreas Seppi /  Dmitry Tursunov, 6–3, 6–2.

References

External links 

 Official website
 ATP tournament profile

Rakuten Japan Open
Japan Open (tennis)
Tennis Championships
Rakuten Japan Open Tennis Championships